Atorolimumab is an immunosuppressive drug directed against the Rhesus factor.

References

Monoclonal antibodies